Roderick Calvin Hilgrove Symonds, known as Calvin "Bummy" Symonds (born 29 March 1932), is a retired Bermudian cricketer and footballer. He represented the Bermuda national cricket team and played one match in the English Football League for Rochdale.

Cricket career
Symonds was born in Pembroke Parish, Bermuda. He was a right-handed batsman and off break bowler. He played for St George's Cricket Club, and is the most successful captain in the annual Cup Match against Somerset CC, having been unbeaten in nine matches between 1961 and 1969, winning eight times and drawing once. He also played for Western Stars, Pond Hill Stars and Pembroke Hamilton Club, and as an overseas professional in England for Rochdale CC of the Central Lancashire League.

He represented the Bermuda national team in unofficial matches between 1952 and 1965. Symonds played for Bermuda in December 1953 against the touring Marylebone Cricket Club (MCC) team, en route to their Test series in the West Indies, and clean-bowled Tom Graveney. He also played against the touring Pakistanis and New Zealanders, but never appeared in any first-class or List A matches. He coached the Bermuda team during the 1990s.

Football career
Symonds played football as a centre forward, initially for PHC Zebras. After going to England, he joined Rochdale of the Football League in October 1954,  playing in one League match against Barrow in September 1955. After returning to Bermuda later that year, he played for Key West Rangers.

Notes

References

People from Pembroke Parish
Bermudian cricketers
Bermudian footballers
English Football League players
Rochdale A.F.C. players
Association football forwards
Coaches of the Bermuda national cricket team
Bermudian expatriate footballers
Bermudian expatriates in the United Kingdom
Expatriate footballers in England
Living people
1932 births